Vince Staples is the fourth studio album by American rapper Vince Staples. It was released on July 9, 2021, through Motown Records and Blacksmith Records. The album received acclaim from critics, with the conversational lyrics and production highlighted.

Background
Vince Staples runtime is approximately 22 minutes, the same length as his last project, FM! The album, like his last, was produced by Kenny Beats.

Staples revealed the track list of the album via Instagram. He released the singles "Law of Averages" and "Are You with That?" on June 18 and July 6, 2021, respectively.

Critical reception

Vince Staples was met with widespread critical acclaim. At Metacritic, which assigns a normalized rating out of 100 to reviews from professional publications, the album received an average score of 84, based on 20 reviews. Aggregator AnyDecentMusic? gave it 7.8 out of 10, based on their assessment of the critical consensus.

Alexis Petridis of The Guardian gave the album four stars out of five. He opined that the album's "spectral take on his region's G-funk, paired with conversational lyrics, deepens his outsider appeal". Kyann-Sian Williams of NME also gave the album four stars out of five, stating "The Long Beach rapper pairs playful one-liners with smouldering beats on his fourth full-length". Pastes Matt Mitchell gave the album an 8.2 out of 10, citing that the foundation of Staples' success "starts in the basement of survival, while other rappers punctuate their ladder-climbing with long bars about seven-figure houses, island getaways and private jets." PopMatters John Amen gave the album a score of 8 out of 10, concluding, "With his latest jewel, Staples mines an artistic, existential, and notably fertile limbo." Matthew Davies Lombardi from DIY enjoyed the album, saying, "There's just enough instrumentation to add depth and texture to Vince's characteristically excellent delivery, but the rapper still stands front and centre, allowing a less bombastic tone to shine. ... If you arrive looking for the hooks of "Norf Norf" or the explosive chemistry of "BagBak" you could be leaving half empty-handed. But if you're here for Vince Staples, you might just see more of him than ever". Reviewing the album for AllMusic, Neil Z. Yeung stated, "Though the set feels somewhat sleepy upon first listen, repeat visits reward listeners with Staples' depth and wit, cementing Vince Staples as a simple yet focused statement from one of the West Coast's most relevant voices".

Beats Per Minute critic Chase McMullen said, "Vince Staples is certainly not an easy album to tap into, nor a particularly fun one, but for those interested in a piece of art in which the barrier between the creator and onlooker is veritably nonexistent, to the point of shared claustrophobia, look no further. ... Staples' scars have never been more visible: he's practically put them on display for the world at large. If that's not bravery, I don't know what is". Dylan Green of Pitchfork said, "Vince Staples has movement but lacks velocity, which casts his words in the most intimate light imaginable. ... Even if you're looking for the booming pastel energy of Kenny [Beats]'s recent collaboration with TiaCorine or the breathless vibes of his work on Vince's FM!, Vince Staples still has plenty to recommend. The sonic palette is grayscale without being boring, stoic without missing bounce".

Year-end lists

Track listing

Notes
  signifies a co-producer
 All tracks are stylized in all caps.
 On the informational sticker for the vinyl of this album, the interlude "Lakewood Mall" has an extended title of "Lakewood Mall (Free Pac Slimm)".

Personnel 

 Vince Staples – vocals
 Michelle Mancini – mastering engineer
 Manny Marroquin – mix engineer
 Kenny Beats – recording engineer
 Anthony Vilchis – assistant mixer
 Chris Galland – assistant mixer
 Jeremie Inhaber – assistant mixer
 Zach Pereyra – assistant mixer
 Mama – vocals (6)
 Fousheé – vocals (7)
 Tyson – vocals (9)

Charts

References

2021 albums
Vince Staples albums
Capitol Records albums
Motown albums